Nasser Eljahori is a Yemeni Brigadier in the Yemeni army. He quit his position as Head of Brigade 121 over the 2011 Yemeni uprising.

References

Yemeni military officers
Living people
Year of birth missing (living people)
Place of birth missing (living people)
21st-century Yemeni people